The 2004 Dallas Burn season was the eighth season of the Major League Soccer team. The season saw the team fail to make the playoffs for the second consecutive year. The season was also the first full season under head coach Colin Clarke. The team moved from Dragon Stadium back to the Cotton Bowl. It would be the last full season for the team in the Cotton Bowl, as they would move to their current stadium in Frisco in 2005.  It was also the team's final season as the Burn. With the move to their own stadium the next year, the team would be rebranded as FC Dallas in 2005. Burn forward Eddie Johnson shared the Golden Boot Award with Brian Ching, tying him for the most goals in the MLS with 12. Johnson was the second Burn player to win the award, with Jason Kreis previously winning it in 1999.

Regular season

U.S. Open Cup

References

External links
 

2004
Dallas
Dallas Burn